Epinions.com was a general consumer review site established in 1999. Epinions was acquired in 2003 by DealTime, later Shopping.com, which was acquired by eBay in 2005. Epinions users could access reviews about a variety of items. On 25 March 2014, all community features, and features for submitting and editing reviews, were disabled.  Subsequently, in May 2018, the site was fully closed down, and URLs in the epinions.com domain redirect to Shopping.com.

Corporate history
Epinions was founded in 1999, during the dot-com bubble, by Nirav Tolia (who left Yahoo and $10M of unvested shares), Naval Ravikant (formerly of @Home where he left $4M in options), Ramanathan Guha (from Netscape by way of AOL where he left ~$4M in stock options), Mike Speiser (formerly of McKinsey), and Dion Lim (formerly of Morgan Stanley) with $8 million in seed financing from venture capitalists Benchmark Capital and August Capital.

By January 2003 it had 5.8 million users, but all of the founders other than Tolia had left, and the company had just started to make a profit in 2002. In the words of Tolia: "We felt we couldn't finish what we started because we had a little problem. We needed a viable business model."

In 2003, the company Dealtime acquired Epinions for an undisclosed amount of stock and Tolia became the COO of the new company, Shopping.com. The four co-founders who had left consented to the deal, which rendered their shares worthless.  Shopping.com had an initial public offering on October 30, 2004.  At the end of trading that day, Shopping.com was worth $750 million; the two VC firms' shares were worth ~$60M, and Tolia's shares were worth ~$20M.

In January 2005, the four co-founders who had left and other Epinions employee-stockholders filed a lawsuit against Tolia and the two VC firms that provided seed funding. The suit claimed that the defendants "failed to share with them 'material facts concerning Epinions' financial affairs,' including news of a deal with Google that the company knew would increase its 2003 profit by 1,400 percent". The case was settled by December 2005; financial terms were not disclosed.

In June 2005 eBay and Shopping.com announced that eBay would acquire Shopping.com for $634M and the transaction was completed in August of that year.

On February 25, 2014 the company announced that as of March 25, 2014, all Epinions community features and member login would be removed and/or disabled from the Epinions website. The staff at Epinions made it clear the community members would no longer be able to delete or edit their content submissions, and that their submissions would remain on Epinions and the eBay networks without future compensation.

No new product reviews have appeared on the site since March 2014.

Reputation culture

Epinions.com’s reputation system was not abuse-proof, but the company maintained a customer care unit in the event a dispute did arise.

Early in 2000, the San Francisco Chronicle interviewed co-founder Mike Speiser and early member Brian Koller, with Speiser claiming the system prevents advertorials from getting exposure, but Koller saying: "There is a lot of 'You scratch my back, I’ll scratch yours,' and mutual admiration societies. You recommend me and mine, I’ll do the same for you."

The site was also recognized in 2007 by the "Internet for Beginners" writer for About.com as one of the web's 10 most valuable web sites.  Calling the site "wonderful", "Internet for Beginners" Editor Paul Gil wrote, "This is a truly valuable resource for the smart consumer.".  The praise was echoed by a CBS television affiliate in California that named Epinions its "Site of the Day"

See also
 Consumer protection
 Reputation system
 Reputation management

References

External links
 Official Website

American review websites
Defunct American websites
Internet properties established in 1999
Internet properties disestablished in 2014
1999 establishments in California